Erastes may refer to:
 Erastes (Ancient Greece), an adult male in a relationship with a younger male, also known as the philetor
 Erastes tou oneirou, a 1974 Greek comedy   
 Erastes Fulmen, a character in the TV miniseries Rome
 Erastes (author) (born 1959), pseudonymous writer of romantic fiction